Duchy of Świecie was a duchy in Pomerelia centred around Świecie. Its only ruler was duke Mestwin II of the Samboride dynasty.

History 
The state was established between 1248 and 1264, with duke Mestwin II being given the lands by his father, Swietopelk II, from the Duchy of Gdańsk. He was originally given the lands around Raciąż and Szczytno, and around 1264, he incorporated into his territories Świecie, conquered from the Duchy of Kuyavia, which become the capital of the state. In 1269, it incorporated the Duchy of Lubiszewo, and the year later, in 1270, it conquered the Duchy of Gdańsk, uniting its lands into the Duchy of Pomerelia.

Citations

Notes

References 

Former countries in Europe
Former monarchies of Europe
Pomeranian duchies
States and territories established in the 13th century
States and territories disestablished in 1270
13th-century establishments in Europe
13th-century disestablishments in Europe
13th-century establishments in Poland
13th-century disestablishments in Poland